Skogsøya is an island in Øksnes Municipality in Nordland county, Norway.

The  island has just 26 residents on it (in 2017), down from a high of several hundred residents in the 1930s. Most of the population lives along the southern coast of the island, where the historic Øksnes Church is located.  The municipal administration for Øksnes was historically located on this island, but it was moved to the village of Myre on the main island of Langøya during the 20th century.

See also
List of islands of Norway

References

Islands of Nordland
Øksnes